The 1932 Boston University Pioneers football team was an American football team that represented Boston University as an independent during the 1932 college football season. In its first and only season under head coach Myles Lane, the team compiled a 2–3–2 record and was outscored by a total of 100 to 47.

Schedule

References

Boston University
Boston University Terriers football seasons
Boston University football